KZAZ may refer to:
 KZAZ (FM), a radio station licensed to Bellingham, Washington, United States
 KMSB, a television station licensed to Tucson, Arizona, United States, which held the call sign KZAZ from 1967 to 1985
 Local Election Commissions (Albania)